In response to the United Nations Decade of Education for Sustainable Development (DESD, 2005-2014), the United Nations University (UNU) called for the development of regional networks for the promotion of Education for Sustainable Development (ESD). These networks address local sustainable development challenges through research and capacity development. This was the birth of Regional Centres of Expertise on ESD (RCEs). RCEs are acknowledged by the UNU based on recommendations of the Ubuntu Committee of Peers for the RCEs, which consists of signatories of the Ubuntu Declaration signed in 2002.

RCEs aspire to achieve the goals of the DESD by translating its global objectives into the context of the local communities in which they operate. This is then accomplished by acting as a catalyst for institutions that promote ESD through formal, non-formal and informal education, and by providing suitable platforms to share information and experiences and to promote dialogue among regional stakeholders through partnerships for sustainable development. They also develop regional knowledge bases to support ESD and promote its goals in a resource effective manner. This can be achieved through the delivery of training programmes, by facilitating research into ESD, through public awareness raising, and by increasing the quality and access to ESD in the region.

An RCE should have four core elements:

 Governance - addressing issues of RCE management and leadership
 Collaboration - addressing the engagement of actors from all levels of formal, non-formal and informal education
 Research and development - addressing the role of research and its inclusion in RCE activities, as well as contributing to the design of strategies for collaborative activities, including those with other RCEs
 Transformative education - contributing to the transformation of the current education and training systems to satisfy ambitions of the region regarding sustainable living and livelihood.

RCEs also have four major ESD goals to be promoted in an effective way:

 Re-orientating education towards SD, by covering integrating SD and ESD into the current curriculum and tailoring it to address issues and local context of the community in which they operate;
 Increase access to quality education that is most needed in the regional context;
 Deliver trainers’ training programmes and to develop methodologies and learning materials for them;
 Lead advocacy and awareness raising efforts to raise public awareness about the importance of educators and the essential role of ESD in achieving a sustainable future. RCEs promote the long-term goals of ESD, such as environmental stewardship, social justice, and improvement of the quality of life.

RCEs are not only significant for the region itself, where they provide a unique opportunity to promote learning and development for SD, but also important at international level where they help to constitute the Global Learning Space for Sustainable Development. Globally, RCEs are facilitated through the United Nations University Institute for Advanced Studies (UNU-IAS) who provide a framework for strategy, best practice and techniques for success, which can then be translated to the regional level.

RCEs have recently been acknowledged in the 2009 Bonn Declaration which calls for action to “develop knowledge through ESD networking” through “networks that could serve as centres of expertise and innovation”.

RCEs around the world 
As of January 2023, there are 170 RCEs in the Global network  including:

In Africa:
 Buea, Cameroon
 Cairo, Egypt
 Central Kenya, Kenya
 Dar es Salaam, Tanzania
 Gauteng, South Africa
 Ghana
 Greater Eastern Uganda, Uganda
 Greater Kampala, Uganda
 Greater Masaka, Uganda
 Greater Mbarara, Uganda
 Greater Nairobi, Kenya
 Greater Pwani, Kenya
 Harare, Zimbabwe
 Jordan, Jordan
 Kaduna, Nigeria
 Kano, Nigeria
 Kakamega-Western, Kenya
 Khomas-Erongo, Namibia
 KwaZulu Natal, South Africa
 Lagos, Nigeria
 Lesotho
 Lusaka, Zambia
 Mau Ecosystem Complex, Kenya
 Makana and Rural Eastern Cape, South Africa
 Maputo, Mozambique
 Minna, Nigeria
 Mount Kenya East, Kenya
 Mutare, Zimbabwe
 North Rift, Kenya
 Nyanza, Kenya
 Port Harcourt, Nigeria
 Senegal
 South Rift, Kenya 
 Swaziland
 Zaria, Nigeria
 Zomba, Malawi

In Europe and the Middle East:
 Açores, Portugal 
 Barcelona, Spain
Albania, Middle Albania
 Bordeaux-Aquitaine, France
 Brittany, France
 Central Macedonia
 Crete, Greece
 Creias-Oeste, Portugal
 Czechia, Czech Republic
 Denmark, Denmark
 Dublin, Ireland
 East Midlands, UK
 Espoo, Finland
 Euroregion Tyrol
  Graz-Styria, Austria
 Greater Manchester, UK
 Hamburg, Germany
 Ireland
 London, UK
 Munich, Germany
 Nizhny Novgorod, Russia
 North East Centre for Transformative Education and Research (NECTER), UK
 North Sweden
 Nuremberg, Germany
 Oldenburger Muensterland
 Paris Seine
 Porto Metropolitan Area, Portugal
 Rhein Meuse Cross Border Rhine-Meuse region Netherlands/Germany/France
 Ruhr  
 Samara, Russia
 Scotland
 Severn, UK
 RCE Skane, Sweden
Skane, Sweden
 Southern Black Forest
 Southern North Sea, Belgium/Netherlands/France
 Uppsala-Gotland, Sweden
 Vienna, Austria
 Vilnius, Lithuania
 Vojvodina, Serbia
 Wales, UK
  West Sweden
 Yorkshire and Humberside, UK

In South America and the Caribbean:
 Bogota, Colombia
 Chaco, Argentina
 Cuenca del Plata, Argentina
 Curitiba-Parana, Brazil
 Lima-Callao, Peru
 Rio de Janeiro, Brazil
 São Paulo, Brazil

In North and Central America:
 Atlanta, USA
 Borderlands Mexico, USA
 British Columbia, Canada
 Georgetown, USA
 Grand Rapids, USA
 Greater Burlington, USA
 Greater Sudbury, Canada
 Greater Portland, USA
 Guatemala
 Montreal, Canada
 North Texas, USA
 Peterborough-Kawarthas, Canada
 Salisbury, Maryland, USA 
 Saskatchewan, Canada
 Shenandoah Valley, USA
 Tantramar, Canada
 Toronto,  Canada
 Mauricie/Centre-du-Quebec, Canada
 Western Jalisco, Mexico

In the Asia-Pacific region
 Australia, Western Australia; Perth and Albany.
 Anji, China
 Arunachal Pradesh, India
 Bangalore, India
 Beijing, China
 Bogor, Indonesia
 Bohol, Philippines
 Cebu, Philippines
 Central Semenanjung, Malaysia
 Cha-am, Thailand
 Chandigarh, India
 Changwon, Korea
 Chennai, India
 Chubu, Japan
 Delhi, India
 East Kalimantan, Indonesia
 Gippsland, Australia
 Goa, India
 Greater Dhaka, Bangladesh
 Greater Phnom Penh, Cambodia
 Greater Sendai, Japan 
 Greater Western Sydney, Australia
 Guwahati, India
 Hohhot, China
 Hokkaido Central, Japan
 Hyogo-Kobe, Japan
 Ilocos, Philippines
 Incheon, Korea
 Inje, Korea
 Iskandar, Malaysia
 Jammu, India
 Kitakyushu, Japan
 Kodagu, India
 Kunming, China
 Kyrgyzstan
 Lucknow, India
 Maha Sarakham, Thailand
 Mumbai, India
 Murray-Darling, Australia
 Northern Mindanao, Philippines
 Okayama, Japan
 Penang, Malaysia
 Pune, India
 Shangri-la, China
 Pacific Island Countries
 Southern Vietnam
 Srinagar, India
 Tasmania, Australia
 Thiruvananthapuram, India
 Tianjin, China
 Tirupati, India
 Tongyeong, Korea
 Trang, Thailand
 Ulju, Korea
 Waikato, New Zealand
 Yogyakarta, Indonesia
 Yokohama, Japan

References

External links 
 The United Nations Decade of Education for Sustainable Development
 United Nations University Headquarters
 United Nations University - Institute for the Advanced Study of Sustainability

Sustainability organizations
International sustainable development